Commodore John Charles Pritz (Portuguese: João Carlos Pedro Pritz) was a Danish mariner who had a career with the Brazilian Imperial Navy during the Cisplatine War.

Biography
Pritz was part of the First Division, also called División Bloqueo, of the Brazilian navy operating in the waters of the Rio de la Plata during the Cisplatine War.  The mission of this squadron, initially commanded by James Norton but eventually taken over by Pritz, was to blockade the primary Argentine port of Buenos Aires.  Although the squadron had superior resources compared to the Argentine navy, commanded by William Brown, it was unable to stop the Argentines from routinely escaping.

While in command of the frigate Dona Paula, Pritz participated in the naval battles of Los Pozos on 11 June  1826 and of Quilmes on 30 June 1826.

On 8 April 1827, Pritz—by that time a commodore, was one of the participants in the Battle of Monte Santiago, in which the superior firepower of the Brazilians forced two grounded Argentine brigs to rely on the support of a schooner.

References
Carranza, Angel Justiniano, "Campañas Navales de la República Argentina", Talleres de Guillermo Kraft Ltda., Buenos Aires, 2º edición, 1962
Arguindeguy, Pablo E. CL, y Rodríguez, Horacio CL; "Buques de la Armada Argentina 1810-1852 sus comandos y operaciones", Buenos Aires, Instituto Nacional Browniano, 1999
Vale, Brian, Una guerra entre ingleses, Instituto De Publicaciones Navales, 2005, 

Danish sailors
Year of death unknown
Year of birth unknown